Frontier Village was a  amusement park in San Jose, California, that operated from 1961 to September 1980.  It was located at 4885 Monterey Road, at the intersection with Branham Lane.  The site is now Edenvale Garden Park, next to Hayes Mansion, and was once part of the sprawling Hayes Family Estate.

History

The park was built by Joseph Zukin, Jr. of Palo Alto, who was inspired by a family trip to Disneyland in 1959. In 1958, Zukin sold 110,000 shares in the Frontier Village corporation at $5 per share; the first designer was Paul Murphy, who also had a full time job at Santa Clara University as director of publications. After Murphy found himself too busy, design responsibility was turned over to Laurence Hollings, who had experience designing film sets at Columbia Pictures  and Paramount Pictures, and nature habitats at the California Academy of Sciences. He described the park as a "sort of tongue-in-cheek approach to the Wild West."

The park was initially to be built along El Camino Real in Sunnyvale, California, according to plans drawn up in 1958 by the Frontier Village Corporation, founded by Zukin, Hawley Smith, and Michael Khourie. Zukin declared "it will be designed as a children's dream of the Old West, where the child (and his parents) can actually experience the thrills and excitement of the West in an atmosphere especially created for fun and relaxation." Zukin later announced in April 1959 that Frontier Village would be built in San Jose. Ground was broken for the park on August 1, 1960, and it was laid out so carefully that only four trees were removed.

The park, developed at a cost of $2 million, opened on October 21, 1961, surrounded by a high barricade of logs, and was themed to the Old West. Admission was $0.90 for adults, $0.45 for children (older than 12), and free (for children under 12). The initial public mascot of the park was an unnamed "Deputy Marshal" who greeted guests and saved them from dangerous outlaws in daily mock shootouts staged on the hour, every hour, at the park's Main Street. The actors were equipped with actual firearms (Colt Single Action Army revolvers and double-barrel shotguns) firing blanks filled with black powder. Retaining the water in an artificial canal for one of the early rides, the Indian Canoe, proved troublesome until the canal was lined with cement. Although the park was open year-round, operating hours were switched to weekends only during the off-season (fall to spring). More than one million people visited the park in its first three years of operation.

The 1964 summer season opened on Saturday, June 20, marked by a special "Family Fun Day". Frontier Village was praised as "spotless, rarely jammed ... one can take in all of the rides and attractions within about four hours." Jim Bakich, a first-year student at San Jose City College, attempted to set a world's record for the longest continuous Ferris wheel ride in 1965, vowing to spend two full weeks aboard the park's wheel. Other self-claimed world records set at the park in 1966 include the finish of the longest foot-propelled scooter journey ( from Big Sur, by Byron Jones) and largest pizza ( in diameter). Dennis the Menace visited the park with his parents in the story "The Park Lark", initially published for the March 1970 issue; while there, he interacted with the marshal, an outlaw, other guests, and visited several attractions, including the Rainbow Falls trout fishing pond and the Antique Cars ride.

When the park opened in 1961, it was surrounded by undeveloped land. A decade later, the park was surrounded by urban sprawl; Zukin lacked the necessary funds to expand and sold Frontier Village to Rio Grande Industries for US$1.7 million in 1973, although he stayed on to manage the park through 1977. That year, Charles Jacques rated the park as the 45th best in the United States, behind local competitors Marriott's Great America (#12) and Santa Cruz Beach Boardwalk (#30). It was also the first year of operation for the Apache Whirlwind, the park's first (and only) roller coaster. Jeff Block and Rena Clark set a new record for Ferris wheel endurance starting on July 1, 1978, traveling  on the park's wheel in 29,744 revolutions over 37 days. Block would break the record in 1993 with a 38-day ride on the same Ferris wheel, which had been relocated to the Orange County Fair after Frontier Village's closure.

Characters from the Hanna-Barbera cartoons, including Fred Flintstone, Barney Rubble, and Scooby Doo, were added to the park in 1979. According to Zukin, the protests and opposition from the park's new residential neighbors, who complained about the noise and fought development plans, led Rio Grande to drop the expansion. Lawsuits from nearby homeowners coupled with lower-than-expected park revenues, skyrocketing San Jose land values, and competition from Marriott's Great America, which opened in neighboring Santa Clara in 1976, signaled the end for the little park. With the high property values, Rio Grande could make more money selling off the land to developers than it could by running the park.

In 1980, the undeveloped land and Frontier Village were sold to a land developer, the Bren Company. Despite a petition drive that collected 10,000 signatures by September 19, 1980, which would have declared the site a historical landmark, Rio Grande announced the park would be closed. During its final days, it held a special event titled "The Last Roundup", attracting 30,000 visitors per day. Television advertisements publicizing the last days included a stagecoach ride and a prisoner lamenting that he would miss the park's closing. The park closed its gates for the last time on September 28, 1980. The Bren Company held a public auction in October 1980, disposing of all the rides, buildings, and lumber that made up Frontier Village.

Legacy
Bren built a residential development just west of present-day Edenvale Garden Park on the site of the planned expansion; the condominium complex is named "Frontier Village".

All the buildings were removed from the amusement park and San Jose's Edenvale Garden Park now exists at the former location of the amusement park.  Little is recognizable from the former Frontier Village, but items such as concrete boulders from the artificial river remain half-buried. In April 2008, artist Jon Rubin installed the Frontier Village Birdhouses, five scale models of Frontier Village buildings and landmarks placed where the original structures were during the park's operating period. Each of the five scale buildings (Railroad Station; Main Entrance Log Towers; Mine Ride; Old School House; Main Street) is a functioning birdhouse and were built by Vince Duke. The present-day Edenvale Garden Park has play structures themed for the amusement park's railroad.

Some signage and ride vehicles have remained in the hands of private collectors, while other vehicles were stored at the nearby Happy Hollow Park & Zoo, to be sold later in 1980 at auction. Two fans started a website to gather history, photographs, and testimonials in 2000. Since 2001 former employees and fans have held a reunion each summer at Edenvale Garden Park to reminisce about the amusement park and a group calling themselves the "Fall Guys" re-enact the park's gunbattles; the reunions were started by Mat Lindstedt. Shaughnessy McGehee of Campbell, California built a miniature version of the park in his own backyard over two decades. He built miniature versions of the Silver Dollar Saloon, General's Store, and Schoolhouse. McGehee also collected Frontier Village memorabilia, including the Crazy Horse, three of the eight Antique Autos (with his most prized being the Yellow Maxwell), the Frontier Village lettering from the front entrance of the park, and the original Silver Dollar Saloon doors. The replica closed in 2015, after McGehee sold his house and moved to Oregon.

It was abandoned in 2000 after Burke sold the property and did not run again until the Glasser family purchased the shopping center in 2008; they spent $150,000 rehabilitating the train and announced in June 2010 the train would resume service; the inaugural run was on August 21. On January 8, 2018, the Burke Junction train collided with a minivan; although there were no injuries, the train was damaged, requiring extensive repairs.

The "It Takes a Village" exhibit featuring Frontier Village was held at the New Museum Los Gatos in 2015; artifacts and memorabilia were shown alongside similar ephemera from defunct local amusement parks, including Santa's Village (Scotts Valley) and The Lost World.

Frontier Village is the subject of an eponymous song by singer-songwriters Jeff Larson and Jeffrey Foskett, released as part of the 2018 album Elua Aloha.

Rides and Attractions 

As originally constructed, the  park was divided into the  amusement area and  parking lot; the remaining  were reserved for expansion. The park was laid out with a central square and a perimeter railroad that traversed bridges and canyons; the square included an Old West village with a stage for live performances.

Rides

Attractions
California Street (Dapper Dan's, Last Chance Casino, Shoe & Spike)
El Sito Mysterio
Front Street (Birthday Party Corral, Games, Hunter's Paradise Shooting Gallery, Ice Cream Gazebo, Skeeball)
Indian Island (Archery, Fort Far West, Indian Island Stage)
Main Street (Arcade, Cantina Murieta, Gunfights, Indian Goods, Marshal's Office, Picture Palace, Silver Dollar Saloon, Sweet Shop, Trading Post)
Nevada Street
Petting Zoo Island
Reserved Company Picnics
Rainbow Falls Trout Fishing (measured ; stocked with 10,000 rainbow trout)
Sagebrush Theatre
School House Museum
Frontier Auto Movie (behind the park on the southwest side) access was through the parking lot for the village. Drive in movie theater open all year round.

See also

 American Old West
 List of defunct amusement parks

References

External links
Remembering Frontier Village
Frontier Village at Defunct Amusement Parks
San Jose Public Library's California Room archive's Frontier Village Digital Collection
  (American Coaster Enthusiasts of Northern California; January 30, 2015)
 
 

1980 disestablishments in California
Buildings and structures in San Jose, California
Defunct amusement parks in California
Economy of San Jose, California
Event venues established in 1961
20th century in San Jose, California
1961 establishments in California
Amusement parks opened in 1961
Amusement parks closed in 1980